The Zawiya Thaalibia or the Sidi Abd al-Rahman al-Tha'alibi Zawiya is a zawiya in the Casbah of Algiers in the commune of Casbah in Algeria. The name "Thaalibia" relates to Abd al-Rahman al-Tha'alibi.

Presentation
Sidi Abderrahman established in the Casbah of Algiers this zawiya in 1460 CE, according to the Qadiriya tariqa, in order to recommend the murids and the saliks.

When he died during the year 1471 CE, corresponding to the year 875 AH, he was buried in a room inside his corner.

A mausoleum of his own was built immediately after his death to protect his grave from any damage resulting from the influx of visitors, the blessed and the supplicants.

Compartments
The structure of this institution is divided into compartments:
Zawiya Thaalibia.
.
Thaalibia Cemetery.
Thaalibi Mausoleum.

Gallery

See also
Ministry of Religious Affairs and Endowments
Algerian Islamic reference
Zawiyas in Algeria

References

1460 establishments
Sufism in Algeria
Zawiyas in Algeria
Buildings and structures in Algiers
15th-century establishments in Africa